The Gujarat Public Service Commission (GPSC) is a body created by the Constitution of India to select applicants for civil services in the Indian state of Gujarat according to the merits of the applicants.

Commission profile
The Commission is supervised under the state governor and headed by commission's Chairman and members for their specific

Functions of the Commission 
The following functions have been entrusted to the Gujarat Public Service Commission under Article 320 of the Constitution of India.

 To conduct examinations for appointments to the services of the State.
 To advise on –
 The matters relating to methods of recruitment to various Civil Services of the State;
 The principles to be followed in making appointments to civil services of the State and granting promotions, transfers from one service to another and the suitability of candidates for such appointments, promotions and transfers;
 All the disciplinary matters affecting the Government servants,
 The claims of reimbursements of legal expenses incurred by Government Servants in defending themselves in legal proceedings initiated against them for the act done or purported to be done by them while executing their duty;
 The claims for granting injury-pensions to Government Servants; and
 Any other matters that may be referred to the commission by His Excellency the Governor

These functions are subject to the limitations imposed by the Gujarat Public Service Commission (Exemption from Consultation) Regulations, 1960 made under proviso to clause (3) of Article 320 of the Constitution of India.

List of Chairmen of GPSC

See also
 List of Public service commissions in India

References

External links
 GPSC  official website.

State public service commissions of India
Government agencies established in 1960
State agencies of Gujarat
1960 establishments in Gujarat